Tropidonophis doriae, commonly known as the barred keelback, is a species of snake belonging to the family Colubridae. The species is native to New Guinea and some nearby islands.

Etymology
The specific name, doriae, commemorates Italian naturalist Giacomo Doria.

Geographic range
T. doriae can be found in the Aru Islands (Maluku province, Indonesia) and in New Guinea (Papua New Guinea and West Papua).

Habitat

Diet
T. doriae preys upon frogs, including their eggs and tadpoles, and on fishes.

Reproduction
T. doriae is oviparous. Clutch size is 2–8 eggs.

References

Further reading
Goldberg SR, Bursey CR (2011). "Tropidonophis doriae (Barred Keelback). Endoparasites". Herpetological Review 42 (3): 447.
Malnate EV, Underwood GL (1988). "Australasian natricine snakes of the genus Tropidonophis ". Proceedings of the Academy of Natural Sciences of Philadelphia 140 (1): 59–201. (Tropidonophis doriae, p. 102).

External links
 Image at Markoshea.info

Tropidonophis
Reptiles of Indonesia
Reptiles of Western New Guinea
Reptiles of Papua New Guinea
Taxa named by George Albert Boulenger
Reptiles described in 1897
Snakes of New Guinea